Michael Crowe may refer to:

 Michael Crowe, teenager falsely accused of the murder of his sister, see Murder of Stephanie Crowe
 Michael Crowe (politician), mayor of Galway, 2010–2011
 Michael Crowe (footballer) (born 1995), footballer representing Wales internationally
 Michael Crowe (field hockey) (born 1942), British Olympic hockey player

See also
 Michael Crow (disambiguation)